Robert Malcolm Ratcliffe (Bob) (born 29 November 1951, Accrington, Lancashire, England) is a cricketer who played for Lancashire from 1972 to 1980. He was a right-handed medium pace bowler and a middle to lower order batsman. In 82 first-class matches he took 205 wickets with an average of 26.39 and a best of 7 for 58. He scored 1022 runs with an average of 16.48 and a high score of 101 not out. Throughout his career he was dogged by injuries, these forcing him into early retirement at the age of 28. He later played Minor Counties cricket for Cumberland.

Batting:	Right-hand batsman
Bowling:	Right-arm medium pace
Relations:	Son: LJ Ratcliffe

Teams:	Lancashire (Main FC: 1972-1980); Lancashire (Main ListA: 1972-1980); All teams
Lancashire Cap: 1976.

References

1951 births
Living people
English cricketers
Lancashire cricketers
Cumberland cricketers